Pendulum Drift is the debut art house feature film directed by Shehzad Afzal.

Shehzad Afzal applied and experimented with a multitude of methods and techniques, developed over the course of his MA dissertation research at Screen Academy Scotland during 2009, to the candidate and host feature film project, Pendulum Drift.

Stars acclaimed Scottish actor Atta Yaqub and actress Vivien Taylor known for her roles in Dunwich Horror and Outpost films amongst others.

Jackie Clark, Scotland based Stylist helmed the Costume and style department.

The Pendulum Drift film Soundtrack theme is composed by musician Shaahan Afzal.

The film, Pendulum Drift, is currently in post-production.

Plot
A security guard's night shift brings forth an eclectic mix of characters and must use his wits and keep his nerve to survive the night.

References

External links

Interview with the filmmaker with an excerpt (work in progress) clip from Pendulum Drift
A filmmaker profile from filmedup.com

English-language films
Films set in England
Films set in Scotland
Films set in Glasgow
Films shot in Glasgow
British independent films